Paula Gopee-Scoon (born 18 April 1958) is a representative of Point Fortin and a former Minister of Foreign Affairs for Trinidad and Tobago (2007 to 2010). She attended the University of the West Indies, where she received a B.Sc, and after that the University of London. She has three children, one of whom was a squash player at Princeton University.

References 

Members of the House of Representatives (Trinidad and Tobago)
Foreign ministers of Trinidad and Tobago
Government ministers of Trinidad and Tobago
University of the West Indies alumni
Alumni of the University of London
1958 births
Living people
Female foreign ministers
Women government ministers of Trinidad and Tobago
Trinidad and Tobago women diplomats